Glomeridesmida is an order of millipedes in the infraclass Pentazonia containing 2 families and at least 31 species. Glomeridesmida is the only living order of the superorder Limacomorpha. Also known as slug millipedes, glomeridesmidans are small (less than ) and somewhat flattened, and unlike other orders of Pentazonia, are unable to roll into a ball. Ocelli (eyes) are absent.

Most adult females in this order have 36 pairs of legs and 21 segments, counting 20 tergites plus the anal shield. Male specimens in this order are rare, unknown for all species in the family Termitodesmidae, and known for only a small number of species in the family Glomeridesmidae. Descriptions of mature males in at least four species (Glomeridesmus spelaeus, G. siamensis, G. arcostriatus, and G. marmoreus) report 35 leg pairs, including a pair of telopods, and 20 segments, one fewer than the 21 segments found in adult females. The description of an adult male of another species (G. indus), however, reports 37 pairs of legs, including a pair of telopods, and the same 21 segments normally found in adult females. Furthermore, the description of a species from another genus (Glomeridesmoides termitophilus) reports some deviations from the usual pattern, describing females with the usual 21 segments but only 35 leg pairs and two males with the same 21 segments (with 34 and 35 leg pairs, including a pair of telopods). Millipedes in this order develop by hemianamorphosis, with leg and segment number decoupled such that individuals may reach the full complement of one before the other.

Glomeridesmidans occur in the New World Tropics, Southeast Asia, India, and Oceania. Two species are known cave-dwellers, and, like other troglomorphic animals are translucent from loss of pigment.  The five known species of Termitodesmus (constituting the family Termitodesmidae) have a commensal relationship with termites.

Classification
Glomeridesmidae Latzel, 1884 - 31 species; India, South America, Middle America
Termitodesmidae Silvestri, 1911 - 5 species; India, Sri Lanka, Vietnam

References

External links 

 Photographs of Glomeridesmidans
 Discovery of a translucent ancient millipede in a threatened iron-ore cave in Brazil, research from the Museum Koenig.

 
Millipede orders